An Evening with Whitney: The Whitney Houston Hologram Tour is a posthumous concert tour featuring a projected image of American singer Whitney Houston. The tour began in Europe on February 25, 2020, and is scheduled to end after a residency in Las Vegas on New Year's Day 2023.

Background
Base Hologram and the Estate of Whitney E. Houston announced that the production will reunite audiences with Houston, using state of the art technology to create a live theatrical concert. It will not be using Pepper's ghost, in which a 2D image is projected on plexiglass and then reflected onto an LED screen. Rather, the specters are projected in front of a translucent screen.  The show will be creatively directed and choreographed by Fatima Robinson, and will feature dancers, singers and a live band. The show is set to feature Houston's most iconic hits, including "I Will Always Love You", "I Wanna Dance with Somebody (Who Loves Me)", "My Love Is Your Love", and the 2019 Kygo produced worldwide hit single, a cover of Steve Winwood's "Higher Love".

Speaking on the tour, Pat Houston, president of the Estate stated:"Whitney is not with us, but her music will live with us forever. We know we made the right decision partnering with BASE because they understand how important it is to produce a phenomenal hologram. They also know that engaging her fans with an authentic Whitney experience would resonate worldwide because of the iconic status that she created over three decades. Her fans deserve nothing less because she gave nothing less than her best."Late February 2020, it was announced the show would head to North America, first stopping in Las Vegas. A few weeks later it was revealed the image would have a Vegas residency at the Flamingo Hotel.

Opening act
Rob Green

Setlist
The following set list as listed in the tour program:

"Higher Love"
"Saving All My Love for You"
"All the Man That I Need"
"I Have Nothing"
"I Wanna Dance with Somebody (Who Loves Me)"
"It's Not Right but It's Okay"
"I Believe in You and Me"
"Run to You"
"Step by Step"
"How Will I Know"
"My Love Is Your Love"
"Greatest Love of All"
"Exhale (Shoop Shoop)"
"I Will Always Love You"
Encore
"Dance Sequence" 
"I'm Every Woman"

Tour dates

Cancellations and rescheduled shows

References

External links
An Evening With Whitney: The Whitney Houston Hologram Tour

Whitney Houston concert tours
2020 concert tours
Concert tours postponed due to the COVID-19 pandemic